Ross Garrison (1867 – January 17, 1932) was an American Negro league outfielder in the 1880s and 1890s.

A native of Pittsburgh, Pennsylvania, Garrison made his Negro leagues debut in 1889 with the New York Gorhams. He went on to play for the York Colored Monarchs, the Cuban Giants, and the Cuban X-Giants. Garrison died in Pittsburgh in 1932 at age 64 or 65.

References

External links
Baseball statistics and player information from Baseball-Reference Black Baseball Stats and Seamheads

1867 births
1932 deaths
Date of birth missing
Cuban Giants players
Cuban X-Giants players
New York Gorhams players
Baseball outfielders
Baseball players from Pittsburgh